University Academy Long Sutton (formerly The Peele Community College) is a co-educational secondary school located in Long Sutton in the English county of Lincolnshire. The school educates pupils from the local surrounding areas in Lincolnshire, and a little from Cambridgeshire and Norfolk

Previously a foundation school administered by Lincolnshire County Council, in July 2019 The Peele Community College converted to academy status and was renamed University Academy Long Sutton. The school is now sponsored by the Lincolnshire Educational Trust which is administered by the University of Lincoln, and also includes University Academy Holbeach.

University Academy Long Sutton offers GCSEs and BTECs as programmes of study for pupils.

References

External links
University Academy Long Sutton official website

Secondary schools in Lincolnshire
Academies in Lincolnshire